P.E.Society English Medium High School and Junior College(PES) is an English medium school near the Hume Pipe in Thane, a suburb of Mumbai, India. It is operated by the People's Education Society.

History 
People’s Education Society was established on 1 April 1936 to operate New English School, which was started in Thane on 15 June 1926 by Shri. V. N. Bhole.

P. E. Society started with Junior K.G. in June 1976. The school became a High School and sanction for 8-10 STD  was given in June 1985.

The first batch of S.S.C. consisting of 36 students appeared for Board Examination in March 1988 and secured 100% result. Ever since, the school has received consistently high results.

The first principal was Mrs. Mangala Karandikar (June 1976 – March 2011). She was a pioneer of P.E. Society schools (Pre-primary and primary section) in Thane for approximately 36 years. She was the first teacher of the English medium school, and the winner of Thane Mayor's award for Best Teacher. She served as the state commissioner for scout and guide association for 10 years. She is a school board trustee.

Extra-curricular activities 
The school has active participation in sports. It offers marksmanship, athletic training, volleyball, football, cricket, and many other sports. 
The school also has extra curricular activities offered by Dronacharya Sports Academy by Major Subhash Gavand such as Rifle and Pistol Shooting Range.
The school also has a tie-up with Prabhav Defence Motivation Academy which offers a basic Military course of three years.

Curriculum 
It offers multiple branches for the junior college section, including: electronics, computer science, biology and information technology.

References

External links 
 P.E.S. Highschool and Jr. College

1985 establishments in Maharashtra
Education in Thane
Educational institutions established in 1985
Junior colleges in Maharashtra
Schools in Thane district